U Kiang Nangbah was a Jaiñtia freedom fighter from Meghalaya who  led an uprising against the British. He was hanged by the British publicly at Iawmusiang in Jowai town in West Jaintia Hills district on 30 December 1862.
A postage stamp was issued by Government of India to commemorate him in 2001. A government college was also opened at Jowai in 1967 in his honour.

References

1862 deaths

Year of birth unknown
History of Meghalaya
Indian independence activists from Assam
Indian revolutionaries
People from Meghalaya